A Twenty20 International is an international cricket match between two representative teams, each having T20I status, as determined by the International Cricket Council (ICC), and is played under the rules of Twenty20 cricket.

Hong Kong's first T20I was the second match of group A in the 2014 ICC World Twenty20 against Nepal, which they lost by 80 runs. Hong Kong's final match at the 2014 ICC World Twenty20 was the team's first T20I victory. The game was against Bangladesh and Hong Kong won by two wickets.

This list comprises all members of the Hong Kong cricket team who have played at least one T20I match. It is initially arranged in the order in which each player won his first Twenty20 cap. Where more than one player won his first Twenty20 cap in the same match, those players are listed alphabetically by surname.

Key

Players

Statistics are correct as of 12 March 2023.

Notes:
1 Mark Chapman also played T20I cricket for New Zealand. Only his record for Hong Kong is given above.
2 Ryan Campbell has also played T20 cricket for Australia. Only his record for Hong Kong is given above.

See also
Twenty20 International
Hong Kong national cricket team
List of Hong Kong ODI cricketers

References

T20I cricketers
Hong Kong